Koševo is a neighborhood in the municipality of Centar in central Sarajevo in Bosnia and Herzegovina. It is located between the older parts of the city under Stari Grad and the newer more modern parts of the city under the municipality of Novo Sarajevo.

The Koševo City Stadium and Zetra Olympic Hall, at which the opening and closing ceremonies of the 1984 Winter Olympics were held, are part of a huge sport complex, which includes the Faculty of Sport and Physical Culture and the university's swimming pool as well, located in Koševo. Also, the city's zoo-park Pionirska dolina (Pioneer's Valley), Groblje Lav (Lion Cemetery) and the city's maternity and children's hospital are located within the boundaries of the neighborhood. Many famous Sarajevans are from Koševo, such as members of the rock band Zabranjeno Pušenje and others. Koševo is home to 10,809 residents.

References

External links

Neighbourhoods in Grad Sarajevo
Populated places in the Sarajevo Canton
Centar, Sarajevo